Gutfeld!, known as The Greg Gutfeld Show from 2015 to 2021, is an American late night news and conservative political satire talk show on Fox News Channel, created and presented by Greg Gutfeld. It airs at 11:00 P.M. ET on weeknights, with an encore episode airing Saturdays at 7 P.M. ET. In the event of breaking news, the show is preempted by an extra hour of Fox News @ Night. The show debuted on May 31, 2015, with Greg Gutfeld as host and Kat Timpf and Joanne Nosuchinsky as panelists. After Nosuchinsky left the show in 2016 to pursue an acting career, Tyrus joined as the other regular panelist. Gutfeld! has been taped in front of a live studio audience since early 2016, and features a combination of political satire, comedy, and discussion regarding current events.

As of November 2022, it averages 2.5 million viewers, making it the most-watched late-night show in the United States, a position it has held since August of that year.

Cast 
Starring
Greg Gutfeld: host (2015 – present)
 Kat Timpf: co-host/regular panelist, (2015 – present)
 Tyrus: co-host/regular panelist, (2016 – present)
Featuring
 Tom Shillue: frequent guest, skit actor (2015 – present)
 Joe DeVito: frequent guest, skit actor (2021 – present)
 Emily Compagno: frequent guest, skit actor (2021 –present)
 Jamie Lissow: frequent guest, skit actor (2022 – present)
Joe Machi: frequent guest, skit actor (2021 – present)
 Gene Nelson: producer and writer, skit actor (2015 – present)
 Tom O'Connor: executive producer, skit actor (2015 – present)

Former panelists

 Joanne Nosuchinsky: former regular panelist (2015 – 2016), replaced by Tyrus

Background and history 
The show previously aired on Saturday and Sunday nights at 10:00 P.M. ET as The Greg Gutfeld Show from its release on May 31, 2015, until March 13, 2021. In February 2021, Gutfeld announced that the show would move to weeknights at 11:00 P.M. ET. In March 2021, Gutfeld revealed that the weekday edition of the show would premiere on Monday, April 5, under the new title Gutfeld!. The final weekend episode of the show aired on March 13, 2021, and the first weekday episode aired on April 5, 2021.

Gutfeld! has been taped in front of a live studio audience in New York City since 2016, but because of NYC's COVID-19 restrictions, this was not possible for most of 2020 and 2021. In 2022, Gutfeld revealed a new studio for Gutfeld! which more closely resembled traditional late-night studios. It included expanded room for a larger studio audience, which, since May 2022, has appeared in every episode. In order to maximize studio audience opportunities, Gutfeld periodically takes the show on tour.

In August 2021, Gutfeld! overtook The Late Show with Stephen Colbert in the nightly ratings, becoming the highest-rated late-night talk show in the United States. In January 2022, it averaged 2.12 million nightly viewers, more than The Late Show, The Tonight Show Starring Jimmy Fallon and Jimmy Kimmel Live!. Since the start of the new weekday format, the show has seen a 23 percent increase in total viewers and a more significant 25 percent increase in the sought after 18-49 age demographic. In October of 2022, the show had its highest rated episode ever with a record 2.5 million viewers, beating every show in late night TV. 

In the event of breaking news, Gutfeld! is replaced with an additional hour of Fox News @ Night, as was the case upon the beginning of Russia's invasion of Ukraine on February 23, 2022. As the extended Ukraine coverage continued for several weeks, rumors surfaced that the show might have been permanently cancelled. However, the show returned on Monday, March 14.

Format and segments 

The show was modeled after traditional late-night talk shows, with the opening segment beginning with the host delivering a monologue, followed by the performance of various comedy sketches by the cast, and concluding with Gutfeld interviewing two guests, who are typically comedians, political commentators and Fox News personalities, along with show regulars Kat Timpf (a libertarian writer and blogger) and Tyrus (a professional wrestler and former bodyguard for celebrities).

When asked how he was discovered for the show, Tyrus said, "I was just messing around on Twitter one day and I said to Greg about one of the jokes on his show, 'I got it. It took me a minute but I got it.' He said, 'You know I've watched you. You're a pretty funny guy. Have you ever thought about coming on and doing the show?' I was like, 'Are you serious?!' He was like, 'Yeah, I'll give you a shot.

Guest hosts for the show include Dana Perino, Tyrus, Kat Timpf, Tom Shillue and Jimmy Failla.

Cast and panelists 
When the show debuted in 2015, the cast originally included: the host Greg Gutfeld, panelists Kat Timpf and Joanne Nosuchinsky, producer and writer Gene Nelson, executive producer and announcer Tom O'Connor, and comedian Tom Shillue. After Nosuchinsky left at the end of 2016, Tyrus replaced her. When the show moved to weeknights in 2021, guests Joe Machi, Joe DeVito and Emily Compagno joined as frequent panelists. In 2022, comedian Jamie Lissow joined as a frequent panelist, after stand-up comedian Joe Machi was seen less on the show as he embarked on a comedy tour. Machi now makes occasional appearances on the show.

See also 
 Red Eye
 The 1/2 Hour News Hour

References

External links

 
 Transcript
 

2015 American television series debuts
2010s American late-night television series
2010s American political comedy television series
2010s American satirical television series
2020s American late-night television series
2020s American political comedy television series
2020s American satirical television series
Fox News original programming
Conservative media in the United States
English-language television shows
Libertarianism in the United States
Political satirical television series
Television shows filmed in New York City